Peter Earl Anderza (October 24, 1933 – 1982) was an American West Coast jazz alto saxophonist who recorded only two albums. Outa Sight (Pacific Jazz 1962, features pianist Jack Wilson and drummer Donald Dean. The bassist is either Jimmy Bond or George Morrow. A second recording date followed in 1963, featuring Hadley Caliman (ts), Dupree Bolton (t), Roosevelt Wardell (p), Clarence Jones (b), and Chuck Carter (d).

Anderza's short and troubled life is the matter of a chapter of San Quentin Jazz Band, by Pierre Briançon which chronicled the gathering of top jazz musicians in the California prison in the early sixties. He was incarcerated in San Quentin from May, 1959 till October, 1962 and then from June to September, 1964. San Quentin State Prison is where Anderza met Bolton, and played with Art Pepper, among others.

Notes

1933 births
1982 deaths
American jazz alto saxophonists
American male saxophonists
Cool jazz saxophonists
West Coast jazz saxophonists
Jazz musicians from California
Musicians from the San Francisco Bay Area
20th-century American saxophonists
20th-century American male musicians
American male jazz musicians